Leandro Alberti (1479–1552) was an Italian Dominican historian.

Life
Alberti was born and died at Bologna. In his early youth he attracted the attention of the Bolognese rhetorician, Giovanni Garzoni, who volunteered to act as his tutor. He entered the Dominican Order in 1493, and after the completion of his philosophical and theological studies was called to Rome by his friend, the Master General, Francesco Silvestri of Ferrara, called "Ferrariensis". He served him as secretary and socius until the death of Silvestri in 1528.

Works
In 1517, Alberti published in six books a treatise on the famous men of his order (De viris illustribus Ordinis Praedicatorum, Bologna 1517), still profitably consulted. This work has gone through numerous editions and been translated into many modern tongues. Besides several lives of the saints, some of which Papebroch embodied in the Acta Sanctorum, and a history of the Madonna di San Luca and the adjoining monastery, he published (Bologna, 1514, 1543) a chronicle of his native city (Istoria di Bologna, etc.) to 1273. It was continued by Lucio Caccianemici to 1279.

The fame of Alberti rests chiefly on his Descrizione d'Italia (Bologna, 1550) a book in which are found many valuable topographical and archaeological observations. Many of the heraldic and historical facts are useless, however, since Alberti followed closely the uncritical work written by Annius of Viterbo on the same subject. The work was translated into Latin in 1566, after having been three times enlarged in the Italian. He also wrote a chronicle of events from 1499 to 1552, and sketches of famous Venetians.

His explanations of the prophecies of Joachim of Fiore and his treatise on the beginnings of the Venetian Republic indicate the current of historical criticism of his day. He was a close friend of most of the contemporary literati, who frequently consulted him. He is often mentioned in the letters of the poet Giovanni Antonio Flaminio, who dedicated the tenth book of his poems to the friar.

Notes

References
 
 
 
 

Attribution

16th-century Italian historians
Italian Dominicans
1479 births
1552 deaths
Writers from Bologna